13th Anniversary Show - Live In Holland is a live album by the Residents featuring Snakefinger. Like The Eyeball Show album, this was not released by Ralph Records (The Residents' personal record label) but instead by Torso Records, which was The Residents European distributor at the time. In 2017 the album was pressed on vinyl by Secret Records.

Reception 
The album was negatively received by some, being considered a lazier, cheaper produced, version of their great earlier songs.

Track listing

References

The Residents live albums
1987 live albums